The 1997 Internazionali di Carisbo was a men's tennis tournament played on clay courts at the Cierrebi Club in Bologna in Italy and was part of the World Series of the 1997 ATP Tour. It was the 13th edition of the tournament and was held from 9 June through 15 June 1997. Second-seeded Félix Mantilla won the singles title.

Singles main draw entrants

Seeds 

1 Rankings as of May 26, 1997.

Other entrants 
The following players received wildcards into the main draw:
 Davide Scala
 Félix Mantilla
 Omar Camporese

The following players received entry from the qualifying draw:
 Alberto Martín
 Christophe Van Garsse
 Quino Muñoz
 Jacobo Diaz

Finals

Singles

 Félix Mantilla defeated  Gustavo Kuerten 4–6, 6–2, 6–1.
 It was Mantilla' 1st title of the year and the 2nd of his career.

Doubles

 Gustavo Kuerten /  Fernando Meligeni defeated  Dave Randall /  Jack Waite 6–2, 7–5.
 It was Kuerten' 2nd title of the year and the 3rd of his career. It was Meligeni's 2nd title of the year and the 5th of his career.

References

Internazionali di Carisbo
Bologna Outdoor
1997 in Italian tennis